Croceibacterium atlanticum is a Gram-negative and short rod-shaped bacterium from the genus Croceibacterium which has been isolated from deep-sea sediments from the North Atlantic Rise in China.

References

External links
Type strain of Altererythrobacter atlanticus at BacDive -  the Bacterial Diversity Metadatabase	

Sphingomonadales
Bacteria described in 2014